Paganelli is an Italian surname, and may refer to;

 Carl Paganelli, American football official in the National Football League
 Domenico Paganelli, Italian architect
 Giuseppe Antonio Paganelli, Italian singer and composer
 Laurent Paganelli, French former footballer
 Manuello Paganelli, American artist and photographer
 Mirco Paganelli, Italian former footballer
 Niccolò Paganelli (1538–1620), Italian painter
  Pietro dei Paganelli di Montemagno, later became Pope Eugene III
 Umberto Paganelli, Italian artistic roller skating

See also
Paganini (disambiguation)

External links
L'Italia dei cognomi Gens.labo.net
Dissemination of the surname PAGANELLI in Italy

Surnames of Italian origin